Traudl is a given name. Notable people with the name include:

 Traudl Ebert (born 1936), Austrian fencer
 Traudl Hächer (born 1962), retired German alpine skier
 Traudl Hecher (born 1943), Austrian former alpine skier and Olympic medalist
 Traudl Junge (1920–2002), Adolf Hitler's youngest personal private secretary, from December 1942 to April 1945
 Traudl Kulikowsky (born 1943), German film actress
 Traudl Maurer (born 1961), German ski mountaineer and long-distance runner
 Traudl Ruckser (born 1925), Austrian former gymnast 
 Traudl Stark (born 1930), German actress
 Traudl Treichl (born 1950), German skier
 Traudl Wallbrecher (1923–2016), German theologian

German feminine given names